Cary Fagan (born 1957) is a Canadian writer of novels, short stories, and children's books. His novel, The Student, was a finalist for the Toronto Book Award and the Governor General's Literary Award.  Previously a short-story collection, My Life Among the Apes, was longlisted for the Scotiabank Giller Prize and his widely praised adult novel, A Bird's Eye, was shortlisted for the 2013 Rogers Writers' Trust Fiction Prize. His novel Valentine's Fall was nominated for the 2010 Toronto Book Award. Since publishing  his first original children's book in 2001, he has published 25 children's titles.

Personal life
Fagan was born in 1957 in Toronto, Ontario. He grew up in the Toronto suburbs and attended the University of Toronto, graduating with a degree in English and winning eight student awards. He has lived for short periods in London and New York City, and now lives in Toronto.  He is married to Rebecca Comay, a member of the philosophy department at the University of Toronto.  He has two daughters, a step-son, and a step-daughter. Along with Bernard Kelly and Rebecca Comay, he co-publishes and edits a small press, called espresso.

Fagan has received a Toronto Book Award, two Jewish Book Awards, and a Mr Christie silver medal.

Prizes and honours

 1994 Jewish Book Award for Fiction (The Animals' Waltz)
 2004 World Storytelling Award (U.S.) (The Market Wedding)
 2009 Quill & Quire Book of the Year (Jacob Two-Two on the High Seas)
 2012 IODE Jean Throop Book Award (Mr. Zinger's Hat
 2013 Marilyn Baillie Picture Book Award (Mr. Zinger's Hat)
 2014 Vicki Metcalf Award for Children's Literature (body of work)
 2019 Joan Betty Stuchner--Oy Vey!--Funniest Children's Book Award (Mort Ziff is not Dead)

Runners-up, etc.
1990 Finalist, Toronto Book Awards (City Hall and Mrs. God)
2000 Sydney Taylor Honor Book (U.S.) (The Market Wedding)
2004 Silver Birch Award Honour Book (The Fortress of Kaspar Snit)
2008 Finalist, TD Canadian Children's Literature Award (Thing-Thing)
2008 Silver Birch Express Award Honour Book (Ten Lessons for Kaspar Snit)
2008 Finalist, Marilyn Baillie Picture Book Award (Thing-Thing)
2010 Finalist, Toronto Book Awards (Valentine's Fall)
2012 Longlist, Scotiabank Giller Prize (My Life Among the Apes)
2013 Finalist, Rogers Writers Trust Fiction Prize ("A Bird's Eye")
2015 Finalist, John Spray Mystery Award (The Show to End all Shows)
2019 Finalist, Toronto Book Award (The Student)

Published books

Novels for adults
The Animals' Waltz: a novel (Lester & Orpen Dennys, 1994)
Sleeping Weather (Porcupine's Quill, 1997) 
Felix Roth (Stoddart Books, 1999) 
The Mermaid of Paris (Key Porter Books, 2003) 
Valentine's Fall (Cormorant Books, 2010) 
A Bird's Eye (House of Anansi, 2013)
 The Student (Freehand Books, 2019)

Children's fiction
 Gogol's Coat (Tundra Books, 1999), illustrated by Regolo Ricci, adapted from "The Overcoat" by Gogol
 The Market Wedding (Tundra, 2000), illus. Regolo Ricci, from Abraham Cahan
 Daughter of the Great Zandini (Tundra, 2001), illus. Cybèle Young
 Beyond the Dance: A Ballerina's Life (Tundra, 2002), by Fagan and Chan Hon Goh, autobiographical
 The Fortress of Kaspar Snit (Tundra, 2004), novel
 Ten Old Men and a Mouse (Tundra, 2007), illus. Gary Clement
 My New Shirt (Tundra, 2007), illus. Dušan Petričić
 Directed by Kaspar Snit (Tundra, 2007), sequel novel
 Mr. Karp's Last Glass (Tundra, 2007), illus. Selçuk Demirel
 Ten Lessons for Kaspar Snit (Tundra, 2008), sequel novel
 Thing-Thing (Tundra, 2008), illus. Nicolas Debon
 Jacob Two-Two on the High Seas (Tundra, 2009), illus. Dušan Petričić
 Book of Big Brothers (Groundwood Books, 2010), illus. Luc Melanson
 The Big Swim (Groundwood, 2010), novel 
 Banjo of Destiny (Groundwood, 2011), illus. Selçuk Demirel
 Ella May and the Wishing Stone (Tundra, 2011), illus. Geneviève Côté
 Mr. Zinger's Hat (Tundra, 2012), illus. Dušan Petričić
 The Boy in the Box (Penguin Canada, 2012), novel; Master Melville's Medicine Show, book 1
 Danny, Who Fell in a Hole (Groundwood, 2013), illus. Milan Pavlovic
 Oy, Feh, So (Groundwood, 2013), illus. Gary Clement
 I Wish I Could Draw (Groundwood, 2014), "words and (bad) pictures by Cary Fagan", 
 Little Blue Chair (Tundra, 2017), illus. Madelie Kloepper
 A Cage Went in Search of a Bird (Groundwood, 2017), illus. Banafsheh Erfanian
 Wolfie & Fly (Tundra, 2017), illus. Zoe Si
 Mort Ziff is Not Dead (Penguin Canada)
 What Are You Doing, Benny? (Tundra, 2019), illus. Kady MacDonald Denton
 The Collected Works of Gretchen Oyster (Tundra, 2019)
 King Mouse (Tundra, 2019), illus. Dena Seiferling
 Mr. Tempkin Climbs a Tree (Kar-Ben Publishing, 2019), illus. Carles Arbat
 Son of Happy (Groundwood, 2020), illus. Milan Pavlović
 Bear Wants to Sing (Tundra, 2021), illus. Dena Seiferling
 Water, Water (Tundra, 2022)

Short stories
 History Lessons (Hounslow, 1990)
 The Little Black Dress: tales from France (The Mercury Press, 1993)
 The Doctor's House and other Fiction (Stoddart, 2000)
 My Life Among the Apes (Cormorant, 2012)
 The Old World and Other Stories (Anansi, 2017)
 Great Adventures for the Faint of Heart (Freehand Books, 2021)

Non-fiction
 City Hall and Mrs. God: A Passionate Journey Through a Changing Toronto (The Mercury Press, 1990)

As editor
 Streets of Attitude: Toronto stories (Toronto: Yonge & Bloor, 1990), 
 A Walk by the Seine: Canadian poets on Paris (Windsor, ON: Black Moss Press, 1995),

References

External links
 
 paperplates books
 espresso
 
 
 My Father's Picasso Published on Geist Magazine

1957 births
Canadian children's writers
Canadian male novelists
Writers from Toronto
20th-century Canadian novelists
21st-century Canadian novelists
Canadian male short story writers
Living people
20th-century Canadian short story writers
21st-century Canadian short story writers
20th-century Canadian male writers
21st-century Canadian male writers